Major General Sir Henry Fleetwood Thuillier,  (30 March 1868 – 11 June 1953) was a British Army officer who played a significant part in the development of gas warfare.

Early life
Thuillier was born at Meerut, Uttar Pradesh, India, on 30 March 1868, the son of Colonel Sir Henry Ravenshaw Thuillier.

Military career
Thuillier was commissioned into the Royal Engineers on 23 July 1890. His early career was spent in India. He became commander of 2nd Infantry Brigade in October 1915, General Officer Commanding 15th Division in June 1917 and General Officer Commanding 23rd Division in Italy in 1918, during the First World War.

After the war Thuillier became Commandant of the School of Military Engineering in November 1919, Director of Fortifications and Works at the War Office in 1924, and General Officer Commanding 52nd (Lowland) Infantry Division in June 1927. He retired from the army in March 1930. He died on 11 June 1953.

Selected publications
The Principles of Land Defence and Their Application to the Conditions of To-Day. 1902.
Gas in the next war. Geoffrey Bles, London, 1939. (German translation published in Zürich by Scientia, 1939, as Das gas im nächsten krieg. Introduction and notes by V. Tempelhoff).

Family
Thuillier's son was Lieutenant Colonel Henry Shakespear Thuillier.

See also
Leslie de Malapert Thuillier

References

External links
Correspondence at the National Archives

|-

British Army major generals
Military personnel of British India
Henry Fleetwood
Knights Commander of the Order of the Bath
1868 births
1953 deaths
British Army generals of World War I
People from Meerut
People educated at Wimbledon College
Companions of the Order of St Michael and St George